Emily Ann Roberts (born October 23, 1998) is an American country singer. She was a contestant on NBC's The Voice, as a member of team Blake Shelton, and she became a finalist on season nine. Songs she performed on the show charted on the Billboard magazine charts, where three songs were on the Hot Country Songs and one placed on the Hot Christian Songs chart. After the show, she finished school before focusing on her music career.
In 2018 she released her first single "Stuck on Me and You," which charted in the top 40 on iTunes. On May 14, 2019 Emily Ann returned to The Voice stage to perform her newest single "Someday Dream". As of June 2019 she is signed to Starstruck Records. A full album is to be released sometime in 2019.

Early and personal life
Emily Ann Roberts was born on October 23, 1998, in Knoxville, Tennessee, to Tommy and Kelly Roberts. She has an older sister named Abby, who graduated from Karns High School, in Karns, Tennessee, in 2015. On Nov 7, 2020 she married high school boyfriend Chris Sasser.

Career

The Voice
Roberts' music career started in 2015, with her appearance on season nine of NBC's The Voice, where she got a two chair turn during the auditions, when she chose to be part of Blake Shelton's team on the show. Her renditions of the songs, "Blame It on Your Heart", "Why Not Me", and "She's Got You", during show, charted on the Billboard magazine chart, where they placed at Nos. 43, 33, and 21 respectively on the Hot Country Songs chart. She performed, "In the Garden", on the program, where it placed at No. 14 on the Hot Christian Songs chart.

Roberts finished in second place on the finale to Jordan Smith from Team Adam.

After The Voice
After the show she returned to school for the rest of her junior year. She took online night classes and graduated in May 2016, and started working full-time in Nashville in June. An opportunity opened in 2017 to be on a gospel tour called “The Gospel Through Girls & Guitars” which led to Emily Ann Roberts' first gospel album titled “Bigger Than Me” in August 2017. She continued to play and sell out all her live shows ending 2017 very strong. In 2018 Starstruck Records signed her and in September "Stuck On Me + You" was released as her first country music single. A second single, "I Got Forever," was released the following month. November saw the release of a third single "Your Christmas Eve". A full album is expected for a 2019 release.
April saw a fifth single "Someday Dream" released. In May The Voice asked her back to perform her new single on the show.

Discography

Albums

Singles

References

External links
 Emily Ann Roberts The Voice artist profile

1998 births
Living people
American performers of Christian music
American women country singers
American country singer-songwriters
Republic Records artists
Musicians from Knoxville, Tennessee
Singer-songwriters from Tennessee
People from Knoxville, Tennessee
The Voice (franchise) contestants
21st-century American singers
21st-century American women singers
Country musicians from Tennessee